Greybull is a town in central Big Horn County, Wyoming, United States. The population was 1,847 at the 2010 census.

Geography
Greybull is located at  (44.491450, -108.053655).

Climate

According to the Köppen Climate Classification system, Greybull has a cold semi-arid climate, abbreviated "BSk" on climate maps.

Demographics

2010 census
As of the census of 2010, there were 1,847 people, 778 households, and 488 families living in the town. The racial makeup of the town was 92.9% White, 0.4% African American, 1.1% Native American, 0.2% Asian, 0.1% Pacific Islander, 4.5% from other races, and 0.9% from two or more races. Hispanic or Latino of any race were 10.7% of the population.

There were 778 households, of which 31.5% had children under the age of 18 living with them, 50.5% were married couples living together, 7.5% had a female householder with no husband present, 4.8% had a male householder with no wife present, and 37.3% were non-families. 31.9% of all households were made up of individuals, and 12.6% had someone living alone who was 65 years of age or older. The average household size was 2.37 and the average family size was 3.02.

The median age in the town was 40.1 years. 25.5% of residents were under the age of 18; 7% were between the ages of 18 and 24; 23.3% were from 25 to 44; 28.9% were from 45 to 64; and 15.3% were 65 years of age or older. The gender makeup of the town was 50.9% male and 49.1% female.

2000 census
As of the census of 2000, there were 1,815 people, 781 households, and 500 families living in the town. The population density was 1,018.4 people per square mile (393.7/km2). There were 923 housing units at an average density of 517.9 per square mile (200.2/km2). The racial makeup of the town was 96.20% White, 0.11% African American, 0.83% Native American, 0.39% Asian, 1.32% from other races, and 1.16% from two or more races. Hispanic or Latino of any race were 4.74% of the population.

There were 781 households, out of which 28.6% had children under the age of 18 living with them, 51.7% were married couples living together, 7.6% had a female householder with no husband present, and 35.9% were non-families. 32.0% of all households were made up of individuals, and 14.5% had someone living alone who was 65 years of age or older. The average household size was 2.32 and the average family size was 2.92.

In the town, the population was spread out, with 26.6% under the age of 18, 7.3% from 18 to 24, 23.5% from 25 to 44, 25.6% from 45 to 64, and 17.1% who were 65 years of age or older. The median age was 40 years. For every 100 females, there were 96.2 males. For every 100 females age 18 and over, there were 95.5 males.

The median income for a household in the town was $29,674, and the median income for a family was $36,964. Males had a median income of $29,063 versus $17,500 for females. The per capita income for the town was $15,383. About 12.0% of families and 14.7% of the population were below the poverty line, including 22.1% of those under age 18 and 12.5% of those age 65 or over.

Education
Public education in the town of Greybull is provided by Big Horn County School District #3. The district has three campuses – Greybull Elementary School (grades K-5), Greybull Middle School (grades 6–8), and Greybull High School (grades 9-12).

Greybull has a public library, a branch of the Big Horn County Library System.

Airport

The town is served by the nearby South Big Horn County Airport  used for General Aviation operations but which was the base for air tankers operating in the forest firefighting role, for many years flown by the local firm.

Christler-Avery Aviation was founded by Mel Christler and Morris Avery in 1951 offering aerial spraying operating B-18 Bolo, B-25 Mitchell, Northrop Delta aircraft. Mel Christler transferred to Thermopolis in 1961 and sold his share in the company to Avery.

Avery Aviation was founded by Morris Avery in 1961 building a hangar and developing the airport facilities. The airline operated Bell 47, Cessna 195, Consolidated PB4Y-2 Privateer and at Avery's death was sold to the pilots.

Hawkins and Powers Aviation was founded by Dan Hawkins and Gene Powers in 1969, after acquiring the assets of Avery Aviation. The airline operated: Boeing C-97 Stratofreighter, Consolidated PB4Y-2 Privateer, Fairchild C-82 Packet, Fairchild C-119 Flying Boxcar, Lockheed C-130 Hercules and Lockheed P-2 Neptune all in the aerial firefighting role. The airline declared bankrupt in 2005 after a series of fatal accidents.

Media
The local newspaper is the Greybull Standard.

KZMQ-FM and KZMQ (AM) are radio stations licensed to Greybull.

Notable people
 Wilford Brimley (1934–2020), actor
 Jim Crawford (1935–2018), player for the New England Patriots of the American Football League
 Brett Keisel (born 1978), former defensive end for the Pittsburgh Steelers
 Bill Wilkinson (born 1964), former MLB pitcher for the Seattle Mariners
 Tom Wilkinson (born 1943), player for several teams in the Canadian Football League

See also

 List of municipalities in Wyoming

References

External links

 
 Greybull Standard

Towns in Big Horn County, Wyoming
Towns in Wyoming